The 2019 IIHF U20 Challenge Cup of Asia Division I was an international men's under-20 ice hockey tournament run by the International Ice Hockey Federation (IIHF). The tournament took place between 3 December and 6 December 2018  in Kuala Lumpur, Malaysia and was the first edition held under the IIHF Challenge Cup of Asia series of tournaments. The tournament made up the second level of competition sitting below the 2019 IIHF U20 Challenge Cup of Asia. Thailand won the tournament after finishing first in the standings. Mongolia finished in second place and Indonesia finished third.

Overview
The 2019 IIHF U20 Challenge Cup of Asia Division I began on 3 December 2018 in Kuala Lumpur, Malaysia with games played at the Malaysia National Ice Skating Stadium (MyNISS). The under-20 teams of Indonesia, Kuwait, Mongolia and Thailand made their debut international appearances at the tournament. The tournament ran alongside the 2019 IIHF U20 Challenge Cup of Asia competition with all games being held in Kuala Lumpur.

The tournament consisted of a single round-robin with each team competing in three games. Thailand won the tournament after winning all three of their games to finish at the top of the standings. Mongolia finished second after losing only to Thailand and Indonesia finished in third. Nathaphat Luckanatinakorn of Thailand led the tournament in scoring with 14 points and was named best forward by the IIHF Directorate. Thailand's Phandaj Khuhakaew and Chayutapon Kulrat were named most valuable player and top defenceman respectively and Ahmad Alsaegh of Kuwait was named best goaltender. Thailand's Patchara Trirat finished as the tournaments leading goaltender with a save percentage of 100.00.

Standings
The final standings of the tournament.

Fixtures
All times are local. (MST – UTC+8)

Scoring leaders
List shows the top ten skaters sorted by points, then goals, assists.

Leading goaltenders
Only the top goaltenders, based on save percentage, who have played at least 40% of their team's minutes are included in this list.

References

External links
Tournament page at IIHF.com

IIHF Women's Challenge Cup of Asia
IIHF Challenge Cups of Asia
International ice hockey competitions hosted by Malaysia
December 2019 sports events in Asia
Asian ice hockey competitions for junior teams